The Rangers Ride is a 1948 American Western film directed by Derwin Abrahams and written by Basil Dickey. The film stars Jimmy Wakely, Dub Taylor, Virginia Belmont, Riley Hill, Marshall Reed and Steve Clark. The film was released on April 26, 1948 by Monogram Pictures.

Plot

Cast          
Jimmy Wakely as Jimmy Wakely
Dub Taylor as Cannonball Taylor 
Virginia Belmont as Sheila Carroll
Riley Hill as Vic Sanders
Marshall Reed as Barton
Steve Clark as Jed Brant
Pierce Lyden as Sgt. Hamon
Jim Diehl as Payson 
Milburn Morante as Bullard 
Cactus Mack as Tom Murphy
Bud Osborne as Rocky 
Bob Woodward as Bob 
Carol Henry as Kelly 
Boyd Stockman as Shayne

References

External links
 

1948 films
American Western (genre) films
1948 Western (genre) films
Monogram Pictures films
Films directed by Derwin Abrahams
American black-and-white films
1940s English-language films
1940s American films